John Edward Ledgard Burton (15 February 1925 – 11 May 2010) was a New Zealand cricketer. He played one first-class match for Wellington in 1946-47 and three for Ceylon on their tour of Pakistan in 1949-50. He also represented Ceylon at rugby union against the visiting British team in 1950.

See also
 List of Wellington representative cricketers

References

External links
 

1925 births
2010 deaths
New Zealand cricketers
New Zealand rugby union players
Wellington cricketers
All-Ceylon cricketers
Cricketers from Auckland